Richard Merton may refer to:

Pseudonym  for Perry Anderson (born 1938), British intellectual and essayist
 (1881–1960), German industrialist, recipient of the Goethe Plaque of the City of Frankfurt